Wemersoniellidae is a family of molluscs belonging to the order Gadilida.

Genera:
 Chistikovia Scarabino, 1995
 Christikovia Scarabino, 1995
 Wemersoniella Scarabino, 1986

References

Scaphopods
Mollusc families